KJSO-LP (101.3 FM) is a low power radio station broadcasting a hip hop format. The station is operated by North Omaha Loves Jazz Cultural Arts and Humanities Complex. The station serves Omaha. The station shares airtime and a transmitter with KXNB-LP, another low power FM station, also located on 101.3 FM. The station held a ribbon cutting ceremony in February 2017.

References

External links
 
 

Radio stations established in 2017
JSO-LP
2017 establishments in Nebraska